{{DISPLAYTITLE:C17H22N2O3}}
The molecular formula C17H22N2O3 (molar mass: 302.368 g/mol) may refer to:

 Emivirine (MKC-442)
 Trichostatin A

Molecular formulas